Fairfield is an unincorporated community in Marion County, Florida, United States. Fairfield has a post office with ZIP code 32634.

References

Unincorporated communities in Marion County, Florida
Unincorporated communities in Florida